Gustavia santanderiensis is a species of woody plant in the family Lecythidaceae. It is found in Brazil and Colombia. It is threatened by habitat loss.

References

santanderiensis
Flora of Brazil
Flora of Colombia
Vulnerable plants
Taxonomy articles created by Polbot